Laurence Joseph "Laurie" Maher  is the former mayor of Gosford City Council  and the former CEO of Coast Shelter, a non-profit homelessness service assisting people in the Central Coast region of New South Wales, Australia.

Coast Shelter and Community Service
Maher founded Coast Shelter in 1992 and held the position of CEO until his retirement in July 2018. In 2009, Maher was presented with an Award for Services to the Aboriginal Community by the Darkinjung Local Aboriginal Land Council.

Mayor of Gosford
He served as the Mayor of Gosford, serving four terms. Maher was first elected to Council in 2004, elected as Mayor in 2007. Maher retired as mayor in 2012.

In 2011, Maher agreed to a proposed merger of Gosford and Wyong councils, stating the councils would become more effective in dealing with the needs of the regions as a single operation.

In the 2010 Australia Day Honours Maher was awarded the Medal of the Order of Australia (OAM) for "service to the community of Gosford through social welfare and local government organisations".

Historical Sex Offences

Following a series of complaints made to the Royal Commission into Institutional Responses to Child Sexual Abuse, Strikeforce Eckersly was established by the Nepean Police Area Command towards the end of 2016. On the 20th of April 2020, it was announced that a 9th man had been charged with historical sex offences with the Newcastle Herald stating "Strike force investigators issued a Court Attendance Notice (CAN) for the offences of four counts of buggery, three counts of indecent assault on male, and six counts of sexual assault knowing no consent given to an 81-year-old man on Thursday 5 March 2020." Laurie Maher was named the following day by NBN news as the ninth person to face court over allegedly misconduct committed at Mt Penang Training School. The alleged offences took place between 1977 and 1988.

A spokesperson from Coast Shelter stated that "allegations predate Maher’s involvement with the charity and is no longer an employee."

References

Australian chief executives
Shire Presidents and Mayors of Gosford
Independent politicians in Australia
Recipients of the Medal of the Order of Australia
Living people
Year of birth missing (living people)